The 1999–2000 Santosh Trophy qualifiers began on 19 March and ended on 8 April 2000. A total of 22 teams completed the qualifying phase and play-off round to decide four of the eight places in the final round.

A total of 28 teams entered the competition and were divided into eight 'clusters' with three or four teams in each cluster. Six teams — Sikkim, Mizoram, Andaman and Nicobar, Nagaland, Arunachal Pradesh and Meghalaya — pulled before the start of the competition reducing the number to 22. Following the round-robin stages, eight teams played the play-offs, and Services, Punjab, Karnataka and Maharashtra made it to the final round.

Qualification

Cluster I

Cluster II

Cluster III

Cluster IV

Cluster V

The first game of Cluster V was played between Uttar Pradesh and Assam on 1 April. However, at 30 minutes into the first half, play had to stopped due to rain. Assam were up 1–0 after a 20th minute penalty kick conversion by Akom Ao. The match was replayed the next day.

Cluster VI

Cluster VII

Cluster VIII

Play-offs
The winner of each 'cluster' played a play-off game each and the final two qualification spots were determined.

References

External links
 Santosh Trophy 2000

1999–2000 Santosh Trophy